The Buran cruise missile, designation RSS-40, was a Soviet intercontinental cruise missile by Myasishchev capable of carrying a 3,500 kg hydrogen bomb payload. The project was canceled before flight tests began. It is unrelated to the later Buran reusable orbiter.

Development
The project was authorized on 20 May 1954, parallel to the development of the Burya missile. The development however, began in April 1953 as a rocket-aircraft system by Myasishchev OKB with internal designation M-40. The project was canceled in November 1957, when two prototypes were just ready for flight testing, in favor of the R-7 Semyorka, since ICBMs were considered unstoppable. Like the Burya, the Buran consisted of two stages, the booster rockets designated M-41, and the cruise missile stage designated M-42.

Specifications

General characteristics
Function: Nuclear cruise missile
Launch mass: 125000 kg
Total length: 24.0 m
Launch platform: Launch pad
Status: Canceled before first flight tests

Launch vehicle (M-41)
Engine: 4× RD-213
Thrust: 4× 55 t
Length: 19.1 m
Diameter: 1.20 m
Oxidizer: Liquid oxygen
Combustible: Kerosene

Cruise missile (M-42)
Engine: 1× RD-020 ramjet
Speed : Mach 3.1–3.2
Range: 8,500 km
Flight altitude: 18–20 km
Warhead: thermonuclear, 3500 kg
Length: 23.3 m
Diameter: 2.40 m
Wing span: 11.6 m
Wing area: 98 m²

Comparable missiles
 SM-62 Snark
 SM-64 Navaho
 Burya

References

RSS-040